Clivina mekongensis is a species of ground beetle in the subfamily Scaritinae. It was described by Lesne in 1896.

References

mekongensis
Beetles described in 1896